Linda Shear (born 1948 in Chicago, Illinois) is a singer-songwriter and piano player. On May 13, 1972, she performed in the first out-lesbian concert in the U.S. at the University of Illinois, Chicago Circle Campus. She was accompanied by percussionist Ella Szekeley. The Chicago Women's Liberation Rock Band was also on the bill that evening. Soon after, Shear began performing with her band, Family of Woman. Following the dissolution of Family of Woman, Shear began touring and released her album A Lesbian Portrait on her own independent record label, Old Lady Blue Jeans, in 1974. She performed in concert and at women's music festivals, including the Michigan Womyn's Music Festival. In 1977 she was a supporter of lesbian separatism. 

Although Shear had little commercial success, she remains an icon in some lesbian circles. Her music and story was featured by JD Doyle in 2001 and she was interviewed in the 2002 documentary Radical Harmonies, appears on the breast cancer research benefit CD High Risk, and appears at www.chicagogayhistory.org.

On September 28, 2008, after 25 years of domestic partnership, Linda married Windflower Townley. They live in Northern California with their two dogs, Emma Rose and Skylar Grace.

References

1948 births
Living people
American folk singers
American LGBT songwriters
American LGBT singers
American lesbian musicians
American LGBT rights activists
Singers from Chicago
Women's music
Lesbian singers
Lesbian songwriters
20th-century American women singers
21st-century American women singers
20th-century LGBT people
21st-century LGBT people